Neil McKechnie (28 April 1939 – 6 June 2006) was a British swimmer. He competed in two events at the 1956 Summer Olympics.

He also represented England and won a bronze medal in the medley relay at the 1958 British Empire and Commonwealth Games in Cardiff, Wales. He won the 1956 and 1957 ASA National Championship 110 yards freestyle titles, the 1955, 1956 and 1957 ASA National Championship 220 yards freestyle titles and the 1955 and 1956 ASA National Championship 440 yards freestyle titles.

References

1939 births
2006 deaths
British male swimmers
Olympic swimmers of Great Britain
Swimmers at the 1956 Summer Olympics
People from Wallasey
Commonwealth Games medallists in swimming
Commonwealth Games bronze medallists for England
Swimmers at the 1958 British Empire and Commonwealth Games
Medallists at the 1958 British Empire and Commonwealth Games